may refer to:

Places in Japan
 Wakamatsu Island, one of the Gotō Islands
 Aizuwakamatsu, a city in Fukushima Prefecture
 Wakamatsu-ku, Kitakyūshū, a ward of Kitakyūshū in Fukuoka Prefecture
 Wakamatsu Station, a railway station in Wakamatsu-ku, Kitakyūshū

Other uses
 Wakamatsu (surname)